The RealNetworks Public Source License (RPSL) is a software licence. It has been approved as a free software licence by both Free Software Foundation and Open Source Initiative (OSI), but it is incompatible with the GPL and the Debian Free Software Guidelines.

The RPSL is used by the Helix project.

See also

 RealNetworks

References

External links
 RealNetworks Public Source License text

Free and open-source software licenses
Copyleft software licenses
Public Source License